William Patrick "Pat" Gorman (10 May 1933 – 9 October 2018) was a British actor who, despite never appearing in a starring role, appeared in minor roles in a large number of films and television productions, including The Elephant Man, Z-Cars, Fawlty Towers, I, Claudius and Blake's 7. He also played the killer in the television series The Nightmare Man.

He appeared in minor roles in 83 episodes of the science fiction series Doctor Who between 1964 and 1985: only six other actors appeared in more in the show's original run.  These roles include: a Silurian in The Silurians (1970); a Primitive in Colony in Space (1971); a Sea Devil in The Sea Devils (1972). and a pilot in The Armageddon Factor (1979). Gorman died on 9 October 2018.

Filmography

TV

Doctor Who

References

External links

1933 births
2018 deaths
British male film actors
British male television actors